Oberlangenstadt is a village in the municipality of Küps in Kronach district, Upper Franconia, in the state of Bavaria, Germany.

Transportation 
Oberlangenstadt lies on the B 173 main road and the railway line from Munich to Berlin.

Sport and leisure facilities 
 Oberlangenstadt football ground
 Nagel golf club

Kronach (district)